The Douglas XP-48 was a small, lightweight fighter aircraft, designed by Douglas Aircraft in 1939 for evaluation by the U.S. Army Air Corps. Intended to be powered by a small inline piston engine, the contract was cancelled before a prototype could be constructed, due to the Army's concerns about the projected performance of the aircraft.

Inspiration
In the years before the outbreak of World War II, a number of countries became intrigued by the idea of developing a very light fighter aircraft, with these proposals often being derived from the design of racing aircraft. Following the consideration of a modified French Caudron racer by the U.S. Army Air Corps, a proposition that was considered uneconomical, Douglas Aircraft made an unsolicited proposal to the Army Air Corps of their Model 312 design in 1939.

Design and cancellation
Intended to be powered by a Ranger XV-770 inverted V-12 engine equipped with a supercharger, Douglas' proposal was considered worth pursuing by the Army Air Corps, and on 5 August 1939 a single prototype was ordered. The Model 312 was given the Army designation XP-48, the 48th aircraft type in the Pursuit category.

However, this very aspect of its design was regarded with suspicion by the Army Air Corps. The Ranger engine was suffering from development difficulties and delays and would never prove truly reliable. At the same time, Douglas' performance estimates became increasingly regarded as being over-optimistic. Accordingly, in February 1940 the Army cancelled the XP-48 contract, and without government funding Douglas ceased development of the aircraft.

Specifications (XP-48)

See also

References

Citations

Bibliography

 Adcock, Al. OS2U Kingfisher in action. Carrollton, Texas: Squadron/Signal Publications, 1991. .
 Angelucci, Enzo. The American Fighter from 1917 to the present. New York: Orion, 1987. .
 Brown, Kimbrough et al. U.S. Army and Air Force Fighters, 1916-1961. Letchworth, UK: Harleyford Publications, 1961. 
 Francillon, René J. McDonnell Douglas Aircraft since 1920. London: Putnam & Company Ltd., 1979. .
 Norton, Bill. U.S. Experimental & Prototype Aircraft Projects: Fighters 1939–1945. North Branch, Minnesota: Specialty Press, 2008. .

External links

 Douglas XP-48

P-48
Cancelled military aircraft projects of the United States
Single-engined tractor aircraft
Low-wing aircraft